is a Japanese actor, voice actor and narrator who works for Arts Vision. He is most known for the roles of the Narrator of YuYu Hakusho, Tsuchikage Ohnoki (Naruto), Mitsuyoshi Anzai (Slam Dunk), Shibaraku Tsurugibe (Mashin Hero Wataru), and Jamitov Hymem (Mobile Suit Zeta Gundam).  In video games, he is best known as the voice of Akuma/Gouki and M. Bison/Vega (Street Fighter).

Filmography

Television animation
1970s
 Lupin the Third Part II (1978) (Onabess' Aide) (ep. 42)
1980s
 Urusei Yatsura (1981–1986) (Principal)
 Heavy Metal L-Gaim (1984-1985) (Giwaza Lowau)
 Transformers: Headmasters (1987-1988) (Cyclonus)
 Transformers: Victory (1989) (Deathcobra) (ep. 19)
1990s
 Future GPX Cyber Formula (1991) (Pitalia Lope)
 Neon Genesis Evangelion (1995) (Captain of Over the Rainbow)
 Street Fighter II V (1995) (Balrog/Mike Bison)
 Slayers (1995) (Mr. Rossburg)
 Initial D (1998) (Yuuichi Tachibana)
 The Big O (1999-2000) (Morgan Schuyler) (eps. 10-11)
2000s
 Gear Fighter Dendoh (2000) (Chief Shibuya)
 One Piece (2001) (Kamonegi)
 Rave Master (2001) (Shiba Roses)
 The Twelve Kingdoms (2002-2003) (Enho, Old minister (ep. 10))
 The Big O (2003) (Senior Officer) (eps. 23, 26)
 Rockman.EXE Axess (2004) (Videoman)
 Rockman.EXE Stream (2004) (Videoman)
 Paranoia Agent (2004) (Yoshio Hiranuma) (ep. 10)
 Samurai Champloo (2004) (Kikuzō) (ep. 1)
 Futari wa Pretty Cure (2004) (Belzei Gertrude)
 Bleach (2005) (Chief of Rukongai) (ep. 22)
 Naruto (2005) (Hachidai)
 Rockman.EXE Beast (2006) (Videoman)
 One Piece (2006-2007) (Captain T-Bone, Don Accino (eps. 326-335)) 
 Black Lagoon (2006) (Tsugio Bando)
 Hataraki Man (2006) (Tatsuhiko Umemiya)
 Ghost Hunt (2007) Reimei Minami (eps. 18-20)
 Hayate no Gotoku (2007) (Mikado Sanzenin)
 Golgo 13 (2008) (Wilson) (ep. 29)
 Fresh Pretty Cure! (2009) (Moebius)
2010s
 Digimon Fusion (2010) (Archelomon) (eps. 5-6)
 Panty & Stocking with Garterbelt (2010) (Judge) (ep. 8)
 Squid Girl (2010) (Principal) (ep. 5)
 Supernatural: The Anime Series (2011) (Gail) (eps. 5, 14)
 Naruto Shippuuden (2011) (Ōnoki)
 Beelzebub (2012) (Behemoth)
 Moyashimon Returns (2012) (Keizō Itsuki)
 One Piece (2012) (Panz Fry) (eps. 576-578)
 Black Bullet (2014) (Matsuzaki)
 Classroom Crisis (2015) (Seigo Sasayama)
 Ghost in the Shell: Arise (2015) (Deputy Vice-Minister Amagata) (ep. 4)
 Blood Blockade Battlefront (2015) (Guevara) (ep. 1)
 Seiyu's Life! (2015) (Sekigami) (ep. 1)
 The Rolling Girls (2015) (Fubito Kuramochi)
 Absolute Duo (2015) (Equipment Smith (a.k.a. Edward Walker))
 One Piece (2016) (Miyagi)
 Dragon Ball Super (2017) (Kuru)
 Boruto: Naruto Next Generations (2017) (Ōnoki)
2020s
 One Piece (2020) (Hyogoro)
 The Aristocrat's Otherworldly Adventure: Serving Gods Who Go Too Far (2023) (Zenom)

unknown date
 .hack//Sign (Lios, Tartarga)
 Chrono Crusade (Edward "Elder" Hamilton)
 Domain of Murder (Inspector Yamagishi)
 Full Metal Panic! series (Mardukas)
 Genesis Climber Mospeada (Jim Warston)
 GeGeGe no Kitarō 6th series (Demon Belial) (ep. 33)
 Idol Angel Yokoso Yoko (Chogoro Shibuya)
 Mashin Eiyuuden Wataru series (Shibaraku Ikusabe)
 Mobile Suit Zeta Gundam (Jamitov Hymem)
 Moomins  (The Hobgoblin)
 Ojarumaru (Mike)
 Oniisama e... (Mariko's Father)
 Rin-ne (Kuroboshi)
 Sailor Moon (Rei's Grandfather)
 Slam Dunk (Mitsuyoshi Anzai)
 Sol Bianca (Lind)
 The World of Narue (Tail Messa)
 Valkyrie Profile 2: Silmeria (Walther)
 YuYu Hakusho (Jorge Saotome/Blue Ogre, Narrator)

Original video animation
Transformers: Scramble City (1986) (Silverbolt, Superion)
Starship Troopers (1988) (Captain Ian Frankel)
Mobile Suit Gundam 0083: Stardust Memory (1991) (Jamitov Hymem)
Genocyber (1994) (Sgt. Jim Kelly)
Street Fighter Alpha: The Animation (1999) (Akuma/Gouki)
Project A-ko 2: Plot of the Daitokuji Financial Group (Kaihatsu Bucho)
ACCA: 13-Territory Inspection Dept. - Regards (2020) (Vint)

Theatrical animation
Castle in the Sky (1986) (Train Operator)
Kiki's Delivery Service (1989) (Clock Tower Guard)
Patlabor: The Movie (1989) (Matsui)
Patlabor 2: The Movie (1993) (Matsui)
Pokémon Ranger and the Temple of the Sea (2006) (Ship)
Ghost in the Shell: The New Movie (2015) (Amagata)
Pokémon the Movie: Volcanion and the Mechanical Marvel (2016) (Eliphas)
The Deer King (2021)
 To Every You I've Loved Before (2022)
 To Me, The One Who Loved You (2022)

Video games

Super Puzzle Fighter II Turbo (Akuma)
X-Men vs. Street Fighter (Akuma, M. Bison)
Marvel Super Heroes vs. Street Fighter (Akuma, M. Bison)
Super Gem Fighter Mini Mix (Akuma)
Street Fighter III: 2nd Impact (Akuma)
Marvel vs. Capcom 2: New Age of Heroes (Akuma, M. Bison)
Street Fighter EX3 (M. Bison)
Capcom vs. SNK: Millennium Fight 2000  (Akuma)
Everybody's Golf 3 (Suzuki)
Fullmetal Alchemist and the Broken Angel (Mudi Nemda)
Capcom Fighting Jam (Shin Akuma)
Everybody's Tennis (Suzuki)
Everybody's Golf 5 (Suzuki)
White Knight Chronicles (Rapacci)
Muramasa: The Demon Blade (Mumyoudoujin)
Everybody's Tennis Portable (Suzuki)
Summon Night 5 (Meadow)
unknown date
.hack series (Lios)
Ace Combat: Assault Horizon (Pierre La Pointe)
AeroWings series (Commanding Officer)
Galerians (Clinic Chief Lem)
Gihren no Yabou series (Jamitov Hymem)
Halo 2 (High Prophet of Truth, Gravemind) (Japanese Dub)
Halo 3 (High Prophet of Truth, Gravemind) (Japanese Dub)
Infamous 2 (Joseph Bertrand III) (Japanese Dub)
Naruto games (Ōnoki)
Perfect Dark Zero (Dr. Caroll) (Japanese Dub)
SD Gundam G Generation Spirits (Jamitov Hymem)
Super Robot Wars (Maier V. Branstein)
Valkyrie Profile 2: Silmeria (Walther)
Ghost of Tsushima (Gyozen/ Legends Storyteller)

Tokusatsu
Engine Sentai Go-Onger (Engine Jum-bowhale) 
Engine Sentai Go-onger: Boom Boom! Bang Bang! GekijōBang!! (Engine Jum-bowhale)
Engine Sentai Go-onger vs. Gekiranger (Engine Jum-bowhale)
Kamen Rider × Kamen Rider Gaim & Wizard: The Fateful Sengoku Movie Battle (Beast Chimaera)
Kamen Rider Wizard (Beast Chimaera (ep. 18, 29, 49))
Samurai Sentai Shinkenger vs. Go-onger: GinmakuBang!! (Engine Jum-bowhale)
Ultraman 80 (Space Ninja Alien Baltan VI)

Drama CDs
Border Line Series (Yoshiyuki Murou)
Mirage of Blaze series 1: Mahoroba no Ryuujin (Narrator)

Dubbing roles

Live-action
American Beauty (Col. Frank Fitts (Chris Cooper))
Anchorman: The Legend of Ron Burgundy (Edward Harken (Fred Willard))
Armageddon (2002 Fuji TV edition) (NASA Tech (Matt Malloy))
Before and After (Panos Demeris (Alfred Molina))
The Big Lebowski (VHS/DVD edition) (Da Fino (Jon Polito))
Captain Corelli's Mandolin (Colonel Johannes Barge (Patrick Malahide))
Chain Reaction (1999 TV Asahi edition) (Lucasz Screbneski (Krzysztof Pieczyński))
Collide (Geran (Ben Kingsley))
Commando (Diaz (Carlos Cervantes), Darryl (Peter DuPont))
Coneheads (Ronnie Bradford (Chris Farley))
The Da Vinci Code (André Vernet (Jürgen Prochnow))
Eat Pray Love (Richard (Richard Jenkins))
Evil Dead II (1991 TV Tokyo edition) (Jake (Dan Hicks))
Existenz (Kiri Vinokur (Ian Holm))
Exit Wounds (Henry Wayne (Tom Arnold))
The Fast and the Furious (Harry (Vyto Ruginis))
The Glenn Miller Story (2000 TV Tokyo edition) (Don Haynes (Charles Drake))
Goldfinger (2006 DVD edition) (Felix Leiter (Cec Linder))
Good Omens (Witchfinder Sergeant Shadwell (Michael McKean))
Here Comes the Boom (Marty Streb (Henry Winkler))
Hot Fuzz (Insp. Frank Butterman (Jim Broadbent))
The Hunt for Red October (Captain 2nd Rank Vasily Borodin (Sam Neill))
The Incredible Melting Man (Matt Winters (Jonathan Demme))
Jarhead (Lt. Col. Kazinski (Chris Cooper))
John Carter (Dalton (Nicholas Woodeson))
Joshua (Chester Jenkins (Michael McKean))
Last Man Standing (1998 TV Asashi edition) (Joe Monday (William Sanderson))
London Has Fallen (Edward Clegg (Robert Forster))
Miss Congeniality 2: Armed and Fabulous (Walter Collins (Treat Williams))
Nineteen Eighty-Four (Tillotson (Andrew Wilde))
Nixon (E. Howard Hunt (Ed Harris))
Noel (Artie Venizelos (Alan Arkin))
Olympus Has Fallen (Edward Clegg (Robert Forster))
Police Story (John Ko (Charlie Cho))
Pulp Fiction (Winston Wolfe (Harvey Keitel))
Risen (Pontius Pilate (Peter Firth))
The River Wild (Terry (John C. Reilly))
Sniper 2 (James Eckles (Dan Butler))
Superhero Movie (Uncle Albert (Leslie Nielsen))
Tootsie (Leslie "Les" Nichols (Charles Durning))
Top Gun (2005 DVD edition) (CDR Tom "Stinger" Jordan (James Tolkan))
West Side Story (1979 TBS edition) (Tiger (David Bean))

Animation
Bébé's Kids (Pee-Wee the O.G.)
Ben 10: Omniverse (Professor Blarney T. Hokestar)
Beware the Batman (Key)
Cars 2 (Toppolino Uncle)
Castlevania (Elder)
Dave the Barbarian (Uncle Oswidge)
Doug (Bud Dink)
The Legend of Korra (Tenzin)
The Lord of the Rings (Saruman)
Phineas and Ferb (Major Monogram)
Pocahontas (1995) (Lon)
Shirt Tales (Mr. Dinkel)
The Simpsons (Birch Barlow)
The Simpsons Movie (Russ Cargill)
Spider-Man and His Amazing Friends (J. Jonah Jameson, Angel)
SWAT Kats: The Radical Squadron (Zed)
Tiny Toon Adventures (Arnold the Pitbull)
The Transformers (Silverbolt, Superion, Runamuck)
X-Men (Graydon Creed)

References

External links
 Official agency profile 
 
 

1946 births
Living people
Male voice actors from Chiba Prefecture
Japanese male video game actors
Japanese male voice actors
20th-century Japanese male actors
21st-century Japanese male actors
Arts Vision voice actors